Matt Caplan is an American actor and musician in the theatre.

Career 
Matt Caplan has released two studio albums and a single.

Caplan has appeared on Broadway in Rent  as Mark Cohen, in the revival of South Pacific and in High Fidelity. He has also been featured in the films Across the Universe and Painting Abby Long, and on the television show New Amsterdam.

Most recently, he originated the role of Tunny in the stage adaptation of Green Day's American Idiot, which premiered at the Berkeley Repertory Theatre in Berkeley, California in September 2009. The show ended its run in Berkeley on November 15, 2009, and the role of Tunny was taken over by Stark Sands when the show moved to Broadway.

Caplan appeared in the original cast of the new Broadway musical Spider-Man: Turn Off the Dark, in many roles, among them, school bully Flash Thompson. He was also the understudy for Peter Parker/Spider-Man. After many delays and changes to the show, it officially opened June 14, 2011. Caplan exited the show January 29, 2012 and was replaced by Matthew Wilkas. After returning to cover Peter Parker/Spider-Man multiple times throughout 2012, he returned to the production officially on November 13, 2012, replacing Matthew James Thomas as the alternate for the role. He performed twice a week in place of lead actor Reeve Carney, until December 2 when Jake Epstein stepped into the part on December 4.

Aside from his roles on Broadway, Caplan has also done voice-over in English dubs of anime at NYAV Post.

Personal life 
Matt Caplan was born in New York and raised in Virginia Beach, Virginia. In high school, he studied theater at the Governor's School for the Arts, a magnet school in Virginia. As an adult, he returned to New York City to pursue an acting career.
Caplan was previously married to actor Karen Olivo. 
He has been married to actress Rebecca Mozo since October 2016 and they currently reside in Los Angeles.

Acting Career

Theatre

Television 
 New Amsterdam - Terry Walters (2008)
 NCIS -  Marine Private Paul 'McCartney' Patterson (2012)
 Taken Away - Johnny (2014)

Film 
 Across the Universe - Dorm Buddy (2007)
 The Machine Girl - Takeshi (English dub) (2008)

Anime/Animation 
 Ah! My Goddess - Keiichi Morisato
 Gokusen - Takeshi Noda
 Huntik: Secrets & Seekers - Lok Lambert (Season 2)
 Kurokami: The Animation - Raiga
 Midori Days - Seiji Sawamura
 Piano: The Melody of a Young Girl's Heart - Takizawa
 Samurai Deeper Kyo - Maki
 Shaman King - Faust VIII
 Shura no Toki: Age of Chaos - Baiken Shishito, Iori Miyamoto, Souji Okita

Musical Career

Studio Albums
Matt Caplan (2001)
Overtones (2004)

Singles
Odd Evensong (2009)

References

External links
Official Website

Living people
American male musical theatre actors
American male voice actors
Male actors from New York City
Year of birth missing (living people)